Mikhail Aleskandrovich Kuznetsov (born 24 August 1979 in Shymkent, Ongutsik Qazaqstan) is a male triathlete from Kazakhstan.

Kuznetsov competed at the first Olympic triathlon at the 2000 Summer Olympics.  He took forty-seventh place with a total time of 1:59:13.50.

References

External links
sports-reference

1979 births
Living people
People from Shymkent
Kazakhstani male triathletes
Triathletes at the 2000 Summer Olympics
Olympic triathletes of Kazakhstan